The Greek Women’s Water Polo Cup is the second domestic competition of the Greek women's water polo and it began with 2017-18 season. The first final four of the competition was held in Karpenisi in March of 2018 and the first winner was Olympiacos winning Vouliagmeni in the final.

Finals

Performance by club

References

External links
Hellenic Swimming Federation

Water polo competitions in Greece